Monique Adamczak and Storm Sanders were the defending champions, but Sanders chose not to participate. Adamczak partnered Laura Robson but lost in the semifinals to Jessica Moore and Ellen Perez.

Moore and Perez won the title, defeating Arina Rodionova and Yanina Wickmayer in the final, 4–6, 7–5, [10–3].

Seeds

Draw

Draw

External Links
Main Draw

Fuzion 100 Surbiton Trophy - Doubles